Hayduke Lives!, written in 1989 by Edward Abbey, is the sequel to the popular book The Monkey Wrench Gang.  It was published posthumously in 1990 in a mildly unfinished state, as Abbey did not complete revision prior to his death. Thus, the book retains much of its author's unrefined musings.

The Monkey Wrench Gang and Hayduke Lives! have been reprinted numerous times due to their popularity.

Summary

Hayduke Lives! picks up several years after the (literal) cliffhanger and escape from the posse at the end of the previous book. It chronicles George Washington Hayduke's return to the deserts of southern Utah and northern Arizona, where he continues the sabotage initiated in The Monkey Wrench Gang under numerous aliases, such as The Green Baron, and Fred Goodsell. The enigmatic "Kemosabe" (a hero from Abbey's first novel, The Brave Cowboy) also makes a reappearance, coming to the aid of Hayduke after his escape from the posse.

For a grand finale, Abbey reunites Hayduke with the outlaw-heroes of The Monkey Wrench Gang as they plan the destruction the world's largest walking dragline excavator (giant earth mover, also called GEM or Goliath, used for surface mining) while combating a greed-ridden Mormon Bishop in another attempt to save the American Southwest from development. The narrative shifts numerous times between characters neglected by the previous book, including Bishop Love, the wives of Seldom Seen Smith and the FBI agents sent to end the sabotage.

Earth First! 

While The Monkey Wrench Gang inspired the creation of the movement Earth First!, the latter is cited in Hayduke Lives! (notably in chapters 12, 24 and 27).

In Hayduke Lives!, the people active for Earth First! wear t-shirts and banners with slogans such as:

Notes and references

External links
 Synopsis
 Philadelphia City Paper story about a man who was not allowed to fly (post-9/11) because he tried to board with this book

Novels by Edward Abbey
1989 American novels
Environmental fiction books
Anarchist fiction
American political novels
Eco-terrorism in fiction
Green anarchism
Novels set in Utah
Novels set in Arizona
Novels published posthumously